Highbury is a rural locality in the Shire of Mareeba, Queensland, Australia.

Geography
It is located north of the Staaten River National Park. The Mitchell River forms a small part of the eastern boundary before flowing through to the west.

Road infrastructure
The Burke Developmental Road (State Route 27) runs through from east to west.

References 

Shire of Mareeba
Localities in Queensland